Calosima albafaciella is a moth in the family Blastobasidae which is endemic to Thailand.

References

Moths described in 2002
Endemic fauna of Thailand
Moths of Asia
albafaciella